The 117th United States Congress, which began on January 3, 2021, and ended on January 3, 2023, enacted 362 public laws and 3 private laws.

Public laws 
The 117th Congress has enacted the following laws:

Private laws

Treaties ratified 
The following treaties have been ratified in the 117th Congress:

See also 

 List of bills in the 117th United States Congress
 List of United States federal legislation
 Lists of acts of the United States Congress
 2020s in United States political history

Notes

References

External links
 Public Laws for the 117th Congress at Congress.gov
 Private Laws for the 117th Congress at Congress.gov

 
117
2021-related lists
2022-related lists